The 2012 Ohio Bobcats football team represented Ohio University in the 2012 NCAA Division I FBS football season. They were led by eighth-year head coach Frank Solich and played their home games at Peden Stadium. They were a member of the East Division of the Mid-American Conference (MAC). After defeating Akron on October 13 to become 7–0 the Bobcats were ranked #25 in the AP Poll; Ohio had not been ranked nationally since 1968.  On October 21, 2012, the Bobcats peaked at #23 in both the Coaches Poll and AP Poll, and #24 in the BCS standings. They finished the season 9–4, 4–4 in MAC play to finish in third place in the East Division. They were invited to the Independence Bowl where they defeated Louisiana–Monroe for their second consecutive bowl victory.

Schedule

Source: Schedule

Rankings

Game summaries

@ Penn State

New Mexico State

@ Marshall

Norfolk State

@ Massachusetts

Buffalo

Akron

@ Miami (OH)

Eastern Michigan

Bowling Green

@ Ball State

@ Kent State

Louisiana–Monroe–Independence Bowl

References

Ohio
Ohio Bobcats football seasons
Independence Bowl champion seasons
Ohio Bobcats football